The 1979 Sokoto State gubernatorial election occurred on July 28, 1979. NPN candidate Shehu Kangiwa won the election.

Shehu Kangiwa became the gubernatorial candidate of NPN on June 25, 1979.

Results
Abubakar Rimi representing PRP won the election. The election held on July 28, 1979.

References 

Sokoto State gubernatorial elections
Sokoto State gubernatorial election
Sokoto State gubernatorial election